Larry Cox may refer to:

 Larry Cox (baseball) (1947–1990), formerly an American Major League Baseball catcher and coach
 Larry Cox (Amnesty International) (born 1945), executive director of Amnesty International

See also
Laurence Cox, MP